Eastern technical University is a university located in Kenema, the third largest city of Sierra Leone. along with the Kenema campus, Eastern technical University was designed as a multi-campus institution with a campus at Bunumbu in the Kailahun District, (this campus was destroyed in the Sierra Leone Civil War) another at Woama in the Kono District (this campus was planned after the war and two buildings were erected but the site has been abandoned). The college was established as a result of a merger of two prominent government institutions; the Bunumbu Teachers College and the Government Technical Institute. Both institutions had a long history of contribution towards education in Sierra Leone.

The Eastern technical University acquired legal status as a tertiary educational institution in October 2001. Before then it had put quite a wide range of programmes in place, all geared towards providing educational opportunities  to train as teachers, tradesmen, technicians and technologists.

Current programmes
The school offer a number of programmes leading to a certificates, diploma or degree in English studies, engineering, business management, accounting, nursing, criminology carpentry, plumbing, electrician and much more.

The student number on the Kenema campus is 1,500. The institution employs more than 300 workers of which over 50% are trainers/lecturers while administrative and other service staff constitute the rest.

Degree programmes
Bachelor's degree in Nursing
Bachelor's degree in Business Management
Bachelor's degree in Science 
Bachelor's degree in English Studies
Bachelor's degree in Accounting
Bachelor's degree in Criminology
Bachelor's degree in Government
Bachelor's degree in History
Bachelor's degree in Geography
Bachelor's degree in Economics

Certificate and diplomat programmes
Electrician
Carpentry
Plumbing
Construction Work

Diploma programs
Diploma in Computer Studies

Diploma in Public Health

Mission
The Eastern Polytechnic is "commitment to the national educational goals to continue to maintain excellence; provide essential service of quality human resource development to train technicians and polyvalent educators; moulding them in the best moral and spiritual traditions of the founding fathers to provide leadership in community biased educational innovations and be a most effective instrument of change and development in both the individual and the community leading to a positive influence on society."

In accordance with this Mission Statement Eastern Polytechnic has graduated a good number of well-trained personnel for industry in the technical, vocational, management and educational fields. Entrepreneurial skills given to all trainees/students is a feature that particularly prepares its graduates for the world of work.

External links

Universities and colleges in Sierra Leone
Kenema